Greatest Hits Radio Midlands is a regional radio station serving the East & West Midlands as part of Bauer’s Greatest Hits Radio network.

Localised variants
The station has seven variants:

 Birmingham & the West Midlands (formerly Greatest Hits Radio West Midlands)
 Black Country & Shropshire (formerly Signal 107)
 Coventry & Warwickshire (formerly Free Radio 80s C&W; DAB only)
 Derbyshire, Nottinghamshire & Leicestershire (DAB & FM only)
 Herefordshire & Worcestershire (formerly Signal 107 (Kidderminster) & Free Radio 80s H&W) 
 Staffordshire & Cheshire (DAB & FM only formerly Signal 1)
 Stamford & Rutland (formerly Rutland Radio)

History
Under relaxed OFCOM requirements for local content on commercial radio, Greatest Hits Radio Midlands is permitted to share all programmes between seven licences located in the ITV Central region.

Previously, these licences broadcast as separate stations:
Signal Radio began broadcasting to Stoke-on-Trent and surrounding areas in September 1983. It later expanded its coverage area to South Cheshire in 1989 and Stafford a year later.
107.7 The Wolf began broadcasting to Wolverhampton and surrounding areas in October 1997.
Rutland Radio began broadcasting to the Rutland and Stamford areas in December 1998.
Telford FM began broadcasting to Telford and surrounding areas in May 1999.
Kerrang! Radio began broadcasting a specialist rock music service to the West Midlands in June 2004.
The Wyre began broadcasting to the Kidderminster and Bromsgrove areas in September 2005.
The Severn launched separate services for Shrewsbury and Oswestry in September 2006.
Signal 1 launched separate service for Congleton  and Stafford in 1989 and 1990.

Signal Radio began carrying split programming on AM in 1992, initially airing a 'Golden Breakfast Show' on weekdays before expanding into a full-time sister station, Signal Gold (later Signal 2) in January 1993.

Telford FM, The Severn and The Wyre - all under the ownership of the Midlands News Association - initially ran separate services but gradually shared most programming outside Breakfast and local news. In 2010, Telford FM merged with The Severn and began sharing all output. The stations were earmarked for closure in November 2011 unless a buyer could be found.

In February 2012, MNA sold its radio assets to UTV Media, which also owned Signal Radio since 2005. The following month, The Severn and The Wyre merged with 107.7 The Wolf to form a new regional station, Signal 107. UTV sold off its radio assets - including the three Signal-branded stations - to News Corp (Wireless Group) in September 2016.

In June 2013, Kerrang! Radio ceased broadcasting on FM in the West Midlands and was replaced by a similar classic rock service, Planet Rock, following its sale to Bauer. In September 2015, the 105.2 FM frequency was taken over again by Absolute Radio.

In January 2019, Bauer launched Greatest Hits Radio launched in the West Midlands, replacing Absolute Radio on 105.2 FM. Local programming returned with the launch of a weekday Drivetime show.

In February 2019, Bauer Radio brought the Lincs FM Group and the Wireless Group's network of local radio stations, although these sales was only ratified in March 2020 following an inquiry by the Competition and Markets Authority.

In May 2020, Bauer announced Rutland Radio and the Wireless Group stations would rebrand and join the Greatest Hits Radio network. Two months later, Signal 107 and Signal 2 entered a transition period - carrying local breakfast shows and voicetracked programming ahead of the full relaunch on 1 September 2020. The former Wireless Group studios in Wolverhampton and Rutland Radio's studios in Oakham were closed. Local newsgathering and sales staff were retained.

On 23 November 2021, Bauer announced it would move Greatest Hits Radio's Midlands operation from its Brindleyplace studios in Birmingham city centre to a smaller facility at 54 Hagley Road in Edgbaston at the end of 2021.

Programming
Networked late night shows presented by Alex Lester and weekend breakfast shows are produced from Bauer’s Birmingham studios.

On weekdays, the station airs a regional three-hour afternoon show from 1-4pm, presented by Andy Goulding.

News
Bauer’s Birmingham newsroom broadcasts local news bulletins hourly from 6am to 7pm on weekdays and from 7am to 1pm at weekends. Headlines are broadcast on the half-hour during weekday breakfast and drivetime shows, alongside traffic bulletins. Separate bulletins are produced for the five licence areas.

National bulletins from Sky News Radio are carried at other times.

References

External links
 Official website

Bauer Radio
Greatest Hits Radio
Radio stations established in 2020